Yordany Álvarez Oropeza, also written as Yordanis Álvarez Oropesa, (born 24 May 1985) is a Cuban retired footballer.

Club career

Cuba
Álvarez began his career in his native Cuba, playing with his hometown club FC Cienfuegos in the Campeonato Nacional de Fútbol de Cuba.

While playing for the Cuban U-23 national team in the Olympic qualifying tournament in Tampa, Florida in March 2008, Álvarez, along with several other members of the team, defected to the United States under the wet foot dry foot scheme that allows Cubans who reach U.S. soil to obtain asylum.

United States
Following an unsuccessful trial with Los Angeles Galaxy, Álvarez was signed to a professional contract by the USL First Division expansion franchise Austin Aztex after attending the Aztex open tryouts in California in March 2009. He made his debut for the team on 18 April 2009, in Austin's USL1 season opener against Minnesota Thunder. On 21 January 2010 renewed his contract by signing a three-year deal with the club. Prior to the 2011 season, new owners purchased the club and moved it to Orlando, Florida, renaming it Orlando City SC. The club played in the USL Pro league in 2011, winning the league championship with Álvarez being named league most valuable player.

At the end of the 2011 USL Pro season, Álvarez signed with Major League Soccer club Real Salt Lake on a loan agreement. In January 2012, Salt Lake exercised its option to purchase Álvarez and he signed a three-year contract in February 2012.

On 22 January 2014, it was announced that Álvarez was loaned back to Orlando City SC for the 2014 USL Pro season and the move would be made permanent in 2015 when the club began play in MLS. In exchange for Álvarez, Real Salt Lake acquired Orlando's 4th round pick in the 2017 MLS SuperDraft. This deal made Álvarez the second player ever signed to Orlando's MLS roster, second only to Kevin Molino. However on 29 August 2014, Álvarez was forced to retire after undergoing a series of tests for a medical condition he suffered during a match on 7 June against the Dayton Dutch Lions.

After retiring as a player, he became a coach t Orlando City's youth academy.

International career
Álvarez played for the Cuba U-20 's at the 2004 Copa de las Antillas and made his senior international debut for Cuba in a November 2006 CONCACAF Gold Cup qualification match against Surinam in which he immediately scored two goals and has earned a total of 8 caps, scoring 3 goals. His final international was a February 2008 friendly match against Guyana, a month prior to defecting to the United States.

Personal
Álvarez received his U.S. green card in 2011.

Honours

Orlando City
USL Pro: 2011

Real Salt Lake
Major League Soccer Western Conference Championship: 2013

Individual
USL Pro MVP: 2011

References

External links

 

1985 births
Living people
People from Cienfuegos
Defecting Cuban footballers
Association football midfielders
Cuban footballers
Cuba international footballers
FC Cienfuegos players
Austin Aztex FC players
Orlando City SC (2010–2014) players
Real Salt Lake players
USL First Division players
USSF Division 2 Professional League players
USL Championship players
Major League Soccer players
Cuban expatriate footballers
Expatriate soccer players in the United States